These tables provide a comparison of operating systems, of computer devices, as listing general and technical information for a number of widely used and currently available PC or handheld (including smartphone and tablet computer) operating systems. The article "Usage share of operating systems" provides a broader, and more general, comparison of operating systems that includes servers, mainframes and supercomputers.

Because of the large number and variety of available Linux distributions, they are all grouped under a single entry; see comparison of Linux distributions for a detailed comparison. There is also a variety of BSD and DOS operating systems, covered in comparison of BSD operating systems and comparison of DOS operating systems.

General information

Technical information

Security

Commands 
For POSIX compliant (or partly compliant) systems like FreeBSD, Linux, macOS or Solaris, the basic commands are the same because they are standardized.

NOTE: Linux systems may vary by distribution which specific program, or even 'command' is called, via the POSIX  function.  For example, if you wanted to use the DOS  to give you a directory listing with one detailed file listing per line you could use  (e.g. in a session configuration file).

See also 

 Comparison of command shells
 Comparison of file systems
 List of operating systems
 Light-weight Linux distribution
 Security-focused operating system
 Timeline of operating systems
 Usage share of operating systems

Operating system comparisons 

 Comparison of BSD operating systems
 Comparison of DOS operating systems
 Comparison of IPv6 support in operating systems
 Comparison of operating system kernels
 Comparison of Linux distributions
 Comparison of netbook-oriented Linux distributions
 Comparison of Microsoft Windows versions
 Comparison of mobile operating systems
 Comparison of open-source operating systems
 Comparison of real-time operating systems
 Comparison of OpenSolaris distributions
 Comparison of Windows Vista and Windows XP

References

External links 

Comparison of operating systems

Comparisons